The SunBridge Wind Farm is a facility situated  five kilometres southeast of Gull Lake, Saskatchewan.  The facility is owned by Suncor Energy and Enbridge.   The wind farm consists of  17 Vestas V47 wind turbines, for a total capacity of 11.2 MW.   The project, completed in 2002, was the first modern wind farm in Saskatchewan. It was decommissioned in August, 2022.

See also

List of wind farms in Canada

References

Wind farms in Saskatchewan
Enbridge